Bala Tamushal (also Romanized as Bālā Tamūshal; also known as Bālāmaḩalleh-ye Tamūshal) is a village in Ahandan Rural District, in the Central District of Lahijan County, Gilan Province, Iran. At the 2006 census, its population was 387, in 112 families.

References

Populated places in Lahijan County